Wu Rong-ming (born 23 December 1943) is a Taiwanese politician.

In the 1980s, Wu worked in the Taipei City Government. From 1993 to 1994, he was secretary-general of the Examination Yuan. Wu was close to James Soong, whom he served under as vice governor of Taiwan Province from 1994 to 1998. The Kuomintang chose to expel Soong in 1999 for running an independent presidential campaign. Wu, who had resigned his position as minister without portfolio to become Soong's campaign manager, had his party membership rescinded. After Chen Shui-bian won the presidential election, it was reported that Wu had Premier Tang Fei's support to lead the Ministry of the Interior. Instead, Wu was officially named minister without portfolio for the second time and led the Ministry of Civil Service under the purview of the Examination Yuan. Wu was appointed as Vice President of the Examination Yuan in May 2004, and confirmed to the office in June. On 1 September 2008, Wu became chairman of Taiwan Sugar Corporation. He resigned the position on 14 November, because he was opposed to the appointment of Chen Ching-bin as company president. Wu was succeeded by Hu Mao-lin.

References

1943 births
Living people
Politicians of the Republic of China on Taiwan from Chiayi County
Kuomintang politicians in Taiwan
People First Party (Taiwan) politicians
Taiwanese Ministers of Civil Service